Zingiber kelabitianum is a species of plant in the family Zingiberaceae, with no subspecies listed in the Catalogue of Life.  It was discovered in northern Borneo and described in 1998.

References

External links
 
 

kelabitianum
Flora of Borneo